The 1993–94 FA Cup was the 113th staging of the world and England's oldest cup competition, the Football Association Cup or FA Cup. The competition overall was won by Manchester United for the first time since 1990, with a 4–0 thrashing of Chelsea.

First round proper

Bolton Wanderers and West Bromwich Albion from the Football League First Division entered in this round along with all the Football League Second and Third Division teams plus four non-league clubs were given byes to this round: Halifax Town, Runcorn, Yeovil Town and Woking. The first round matches were played on the weekend beginning 13 November 1993.

Second round proper

The second round matches were played on the weekend beginning 4 December 1993.

Third round proper

Teams from the Premier League and First Division (except Bolton and West Bromwich) entered in this round. The third round matches were played on the weekend beginning 8 January 1994.

Fourth round proper

The fourth round matches were played on the weekend beginning 29 January 1994.

Fifth round proper

The fifth round matches were played on the weekend beginning 19 February 1994.

Sixth round proper

Oldham Athletic reached the FA Cup semi-finals for the second time in five seasons, where they would meet their opponents from 1990 – Manchester United.

Luton reached their first semi-final since 1988 at the expense of West Ham United, where they would take on Chelsea.

Semi-finals

The semi-final paired Premier League leaders Manchester United with relegation-threatened Oldham Athletic - a repeat of the 1990 semi-final. Wembley Stadium was the venue for this match, which was still goalless after 90 minutes. Oldham took the lead in extra time through Neil Pointon, and held their lead the 119th minute, when a late equaliser by Mark Hughes forced a replay. The two sides met at Maine Road for the replay, which United won 4–1 to end their opposition's hopes of a first-ever FA Cup final, and move closer to winning the double.

The other semi-final paired Premier League side Chelsea with Division One side Luton Town, with both sides looking for glory in the cup after disappointing league campaigns. Like the other semi-final the following day, this match was played at Wembley. Chelsea went through with Gavin Peacock scoring twice in a 2–0 win, to reach their first FA Cup final for 24 years.

Replay

FA Cup Final

Two penalties by Eric Cantona as well as late goals by Mark Hughes and Brian McClair gave Manchester United a 4–0 triumph over Chelsea after the deadlock was still unbroken at half-time, and saw them become only the sixth club in history to win The Double.

Media coverage
For the sixth consecutive season in the United Kingdom, the BBC were the free to air broadcasters while Sky Sports were the subscription broadcasters.

The matches shown live on the BBC were: Sheffield United vs Manchester United (R3); Norwich City vs Manchester United (R4); Bolton Wanderers vs Aston Villa (R5); Chelsea vs Wolverhampton Wanderers (QF); Oldham Athletic vs Manchester United (SF); Manchester United vs Chelsea (Final).

Notes and references

External links
 FA Cup 1993–1994

 
FA Cup seasons
Fa Cup, 1993-94
Fa Cup, 1993-94